Dearly Beloved is an album by the American jazz saxophonist Lee Konitz, recorded in 1996 and released on the Danish SteepleChase label.

Track listing 
 "The Way You Look Tonight" (Jerome Kern, Dorothy Fields) – 11:38
 "Ev'ry Time We Say Goodbye" (Cole Porter) – 7:45
 "Someday My Prince Will Come" (Frank Churchill, Larry Morey) – 8:07
 "Bye Bye Blackbird" (Ray Henderson, Mort Dixon) – 11:32
 "Dearly Beloved" (Kern, Johnny Mercer) – 10:53
 "The Night Has a Thousand Eyes" (Jerry Brainin, Buddy Bernier) – 14:24

Personnel 
Lee Konitz – alto saxophone, soprano saxophone
Harold Danko – piano
Jay Anderson – bass
Billy Drummond – drums

References 

Lee Konitz albums
1997 albums
SteepleChase Records albums